"Cowman, Milk Your Cow" is a 1967 song by Adam Faith written by the Bee Gees' Barry and Robin Gibb. This song was included on The Two Best Sides of Adam Faith on EMI.

This song was released as the A-side of "Daddy What'll Happen to Me" in the UK, but in the US, this track was the flipside of the same song that was released as a B-side of this song in the UK. With the single released on 22 September, it was panned by most audiences.

Origins and recording
Faith asked the Gibbs to write a new song after he heard the Bee Gees' third LP Bee Gees' 1st, and certainly got what he asked for, a psychedelic rock song with intriguing lyrics. The backing band are The Roulettes, according to the notes on The Two Best Sides of Adam Faith, an LP collection on the EMI Records. According to the liner notes on Bee Gees Songbook (CD) the guitar is played by Peter Green of Fleetwood Mac. The backing vocals are the Gibb brothers and Robin singing with Faith on the bridge section. The song was recorded in August 1967 inside a little studio in Denmark Street

Faith talk about "Cowman, Milk Your Cow":

Barry agreed with Faith's admission that the Gibbs were a hard act to follow vocally and expressed frustration that performers of the Gibb's work didn't possess the same degree of extrasensory perception that the brothers claim plays an important part in their collective writing process.

Personnel
 Adam Faith — lead vocals
 Barry Gibb — backing vocals
 Robin Gibb — harmony and backing vocals
 Maurice Gibb — backing vocals
 Peter Green — guitar
 Russ Ballard — guitar
 Bob Henrit — drums
 Mod Rogan — bass

References

1967 singles
Songs written by Barry Gibb
Songs written by Robin Gibb
Parlophone singles
1967 songs